Abzar (also Romanized as Ābzār) is a village in Rudar Rural District, Central District, Sirvan County, Ilam Province, Iran. At the 2006 census, its population was 96, in 16 families. The village is populated by Kurds.

References 

Populated places in Sirvan County
Kurdish settlements in Ilam Province